The Chief Baron of the Exchequer was the first "baron" (meaning judge) of the English Exchequer of Pleas. "In the absence of both the Treasurer of the Exchequer or First Lord of the Treasury, and the Chancellor of the Exchequer, it was he who presided in the equity court and answered the bar i.e. spoke for the court." Practically speaking, he held the most important office of the Exchequer of Pleas.

The chief baron, along with the three puisne barons, sat as a court of common law, heard suits in the court of equity and settled revenue disputes. A puisne baron was styled "Mr Baron X" and the chief baron as "Lord Chief Baron X".

From 1550 to 1579, there was a major distinction between the chief baron and the second, third and fourth puisne barons. The difference was in social status and education. All of the chief barons had been trained as lawyers in the inns of court. With the exception of Henry Bradshaw and Sir Clement Higham, both barristers-at-law, all of the chief barons who served Queen Elizabeth I, had attained the highest and most prestigious rank of a lawyer, serjeant-at-law.

In 1875, the Court of Exchequer became the Exchequer Division of the High Court. Following the death of the last chief baron in 1880, the division and that of Common Pleas were merged into the King's Bench Division.

Chief Barons of the Exchequer
 1303 William de Carleton
 1317 Sir Walter Norwich
 1327 Hervey de Stanton
 1328–1329 Sir Walter Norwich
 1329 Sir John Stonor
 1331 Sir Henry le Scrope
 1337 Sir Robert Sadington
 1344 Sir William de Shareshull
 1345 Sir John Stowford
 1345 Sir Robert Sadington
 1350 Gervase de Wilford
 1362 William de Skipwith
 1366 Thomas de Lodelow
 1375 Sir William Tauk 
 1376 Henry Asty
 1381 Robert de Plessyngton
 1384 William de Carleol
 1386 Sir John Cary (d.1395) of Cockington, Devon.
 1387 Sir Robert de Plesyngton
 1388 Thomas Pinchbeck
 1389 John Cassey
 1401 Sir John Cokayne, known as the Elder.
 1414 William Lasingby
 1420 William Babington
 1423 Sir John Ivyn
 1438 John Fray
 1448 Peter Ardern
 1463 Richard Illingworth
 1472 Sir Thomas Urswick
 1480 Sir William Nottingham
 1483 Humphrey Starkey
 1486 Sir William Hody
 1513 John Scot
 1522 John FitzJames
 1526 Sir Richard Broke
 1529 Sir Richard Lyster
 1545 Sir Roger Cholmley
 1552 Henry Bradshaw
 1553 David Brooke
 1558 Sir Clement Higham
 1559 Sir Edward Saunders
 1577 Sir Robert Bell
 1577 Sir John Jefferay, of Chiddingly, Sussex
 1578 Sir Roger Manwood
 1593 Sir William Peryam
 1604 Sir Thomas Fleming
 1607 Sir Lawrence Tanfield
 1625 Sir John Walter
 1631 Sir Humphrey Davenport
 1645 Sir Richard Lane
 1648 John Wilde
 1655 William Steele, appointed Lord Chancellor of Ireland in 1656
 1658 Sir Thomas Widdrington
 1660 John Wilde
 1660 Sir Orlando Bridgeman
 1660 Sir Matthew Hale
 1671 Sir Edward Turnor
 1676 Sir William Montagu
 1686 Sir Edward Atkyns
 1689 Sir Robert Atkyns
 1695 Sir Edward Ward
 1714 Sir Samuel Dodd
 1716 Sir Thomas Bury
 1722 Sir James Montagu
 1723 Sir Robert Eyre
 1725 Sir Jeffrey Gilbert
 1726 Sir Thomas Pengelly
 1730 Sir James Reynolds, junior
 1738 Sir John Comyns
 1740 Sir Edmund Probyn
 1742 Sir Thomas Parker
 1772 Sir Sydney Smythe
 1777 Sir John Skynner
 1787 Sir James Eyre
 1793 Sir Archibald Macdonald
 1813 Sir Vicary Gibbs
 1814 Sir Alexander Thomson
 1817 Sir Richard Richards
 1824 Sir William Alexander
 1831 The Lord Lyndhurst
 1834 Sir James Scarlett
 1844 Sir Frederick Pollock
 1866 Sir Fitzroy Kelly

Peerages created for the Chief Baron of the Exchequer

See also
Chief Baron of the Court of Exchequer in Scotland

References

Further reading

Walker, David M., The Oxford Companion to Law, Appendix I, list of Chief Barons 1660-1880
Sainty (comp.), Sir John, The Judges of England, 1272-1990: a list of the judges of the Superior courts (Selden Society: Supplementary Series 1993, 10).

 

Chief
Exchequer offices